Heidi Rosemarie Brühl (30 January 1942 – 8 June 1991) was a German singer and actress who came to prominence as a young teenager and had a prolific career in film and television. She was also a successful recording artist, and is known for her participation in the 1963 Eurovision Song Contest.

Early career
Brühl's first screen appearance was in the 1954 film Der letzte Sommer with Liselotte Pulver, but in the role of Dalli, in what became known as the "Immenhof films", she became famous in Germany. She returned to the role in two more films in 1973 and 1974.

In 1959, Brühl obtained a record deal with the Philips label, and her first single "Chico Chico Charlie" reached number five. In 1960, her recording of "Wir wollen niemals auseinandergehn" or "We Will Never Part (Ring of Gold)" sold over one million copies, and was awarded a gold disc.

Eurovision Song Contest
Brühl first took part in the German Eurovision selection in 1960 with Michael Jary's "Wir wollen niemals auseinandergehn" ("We Never Want to Be Apart"), which finished in second place but went on to top the German singles chart for nine weeks. She participated again in 1963, and this time was successful when "Marcel" was chosen to go forward to the eighth Eurovision Song Contest which took place on 23 March in London.  "Marcel" finished the evening in ninth place of 16 entries.

Later acting career
Brühl co-starred with Guy Williams in the 1963 film Captain Sindbad. She met American actor Brett Halsey, and moved with him to Rome, where they married in December 1964. In 1970, she moved to the United States where she appeared in Las Vegas and in episodes of such television series as Columbo "The Most Dangerous Match" (1973). She returned to Germany to play in two further Immenhof sequels in 1973–1974, The Twins from Immenhof and Spring in Immenhof. She appeared in The Eiger Sanction in 1975 as Anna Montaigne, the seductive wife of a French climber.

Brühl and Halsey divorced in 1976, and she returned to live in Germany the following year.  She did dubbing work on films such as The NeverEnding Story and Look Who's Talking Too, and her last roles were in television serials such as Ein Fall für zwei and Praxis Bülowbogen.

Death
Brühl died of breast cancer on 8 June 1991 in Starnberg, aged 49.

Selected filmography
 The Country Schoolmaster (1954), as Sternchen
 The Last Summer (1954), as Jessika's sister
 The Immenhof Girls (1955), as Dalli Voss
  (1956), as Dalli Voss
 Confessions of Felix Krull (1957), as Eleanor
 Precocious Youth (1957), as Inge
  (1957), as Dalli Voss
 Ooh... diese Ferien (1958), as Monika Petermann
 Crime After School (1959), as Ulla Anders
 The Shepherd from Trutzberg (1959), as Hilda von Puechstein
 Two Times Adam, One Time Eve (1959), as Kaarina
 Freddy and the Melody of the Night (1960), as Inge
 The Hero of My Dreams (1960), as Marianne Kleinschmidt
 I Will Always Be Yours (1960), as Marianne Seibold
  (1961), as Gaby Fabian
 The Gypsy Baron (1962), as Arsena Zsupan
 Captain Sindbad (1963), as Princess Jana
 Columbo: The Most Dangerous Match (1973, TV), as Linda Robinson
 The Twins from Immenhof (1973), as Dalli Voss
 How to Seduce a Woman (1974), as Doctor Winifred Sisters
 Spring in Immenhof (1974), as Dalli Voss
 The Eiger Sanction (1975), as Anna Montaigne
  (1977), as Anne Coronado

References

1942 births
1991 deaths
People from Munich (district)
German film actresses
German child actresses
Eurovision Song Contest entrants for Germany
Eurovision Song Contest entrants of 1963
Deaths from cancer in Germany
Deaths from breast cancer
20th-century German actresses
20th-century German women singers